The Maamobi market is a major commercial market in Maamobi in the Greater Accra Region of Ghana.

References

Retail markets in Ghana